Francis Loughman (1892 – 13 May 1972) was an Irish Fianna Fáil politician who served as a Teachta Dála (TD) and Senator from the 1930s to the 1960s.

A pharmaceutical chemist before entering politics, Loughman was first elected to Dáil Éireann for the Tipperary constituency at the 1938 general election but lost his seat at the subsequent 1943 general election. He was re-elected at the 1944 general election but again lost his seat at the 1948 general election.  He was again elected at the 1957 general election and again lost his seat at the 1961 general election.

In the period between the 1948 and 1954 general elections, Loughman served as a member of 6th Seanad and 7th Seanad on the Cultural and Educational Panel.

References

1892 births
1972 deaths
Fianna Fáil TDs
Members of the 10th Dáil
Members of the 12th Dáil
Members of the 16th Dáil
Members of the 6th Seanad
Members of the 7th Seanad
Politicians from County Tipperary
Fianna Fáil senators